Diadocidia is a genus of fungus gnats in the family Diadocidiidae.

Species
D. borealis Coquillett, 1900
D. bruneicola Ševčik, 2005
D. cizeki Ševčik, 2003
D. ferruginosa (Meigen, 1830)
D. fissa Zaitzev, 1994
D. flavicans Ruthe, 1831
D. furnacea Chandler, 1994
D. globosa Papp & Ševčik, 2005
D. halopensis Ševčik, 2003
D. hybrida Jaschhof & Jaschhof, 2007
D. ishizakii (Sasakawa, 2004)
D. macrosetigera Jaschhof & Jaschhof, 2007
D. nigripalpis Edwards, 1940
D. papua Ševčik, 2003
D. parallela Evenhuis, 1994
D. parallela Loew, 1850
D. queenslandensis Jaschhof & Jaschhof, 2007
D. setistylus Papp, 2003
D. sevciki Papp, 2005
D. similis Jaschhof & Jaschhof, 2007
D. sinica Wu, 1995
D. spinosula Tollet, 1948
D. stanfordensis Arnaud & Hoyt, 1956
D. sulawesiana Ševčik, 2005
D. trispinosa Polevoi, 1996
D. valida Mik, 1874
D. winthemi (Macquart, 1834)

References

Diadocidiidae
Sciaroidea genera